Elena Mikhailovna Utkina (maiden name Fomina, former name Konova; born 29 May 1990) is a Russian handballer for Kuban Krasnodar and the Russian national team.

International honours
EHF Champions League:
Fourth Place: 2015
EHF Cup Winners' Cup:
Finalist: 2016
Semifinalist: 2012

References

1990 births
Living people
Sportspeople from Volgograd
Russian female handball players
Universiade medalists in handball
Universiade gold medalists for Russia
Medalists at the 2015 Summer Universiade